BIMARU (Hindi: बीमारू Bīmārū) is an acronym formed from the first letters of the names of the Indian states of Bihar, Madhya Pradesh, Rajasthan, and Uttar Pradesh.  It was coined by Ashish Bose in the mid-1980s. BIMARU has a resemblance to a Hindi word bīmār (बीमार) meaning "sick". This was used to refer to the poor economic conditions within those states.  The present-day states of Chhattisgarh, Jharkhand and Uttarakhand were part of Madhya Pradesh, Bihar and Uttar Pradesh, respectively, at the time the BIMARU acronym was coined. All of so called BIMARU states are in Hindi Belt, exceptions are Haryana, Himachal Pradesh, Delhi and Chandigarh. 
During the period of 2008–2011, some of these states started to develop faster than some of the major states and the concept of BIMARU was being considered to be outdated. However, in the recent years, this concept has reemerged due to faltering growth rates of the states.

Historical background
In the mid-1980s, economic analyst Ashish Bose coined an acronym BIMARU, in a paper submitted to then Prime Minister Rajiv Gandhi. Several studies, including those by the UN, showed that the performance of the BIMARU states affected the GDP growth rate of India.

Recent developments
In recent times some of these states have seen real push in terms of economic growth. Although, some of these states have experienced high growth rates, they still lag other more developed states. Bihar's GSDP grew by 80% over the period 2006–2007, which was higher than in the past 2 years and one of the highest recorded by the Government of India for that period. They have laid greater emphasis on education and learning by appointing more teachers and opening a software park. People from Bihar, Uttar Pradesh contribute significantly to  ARMY, C.I.S.F, B.S.F, N.S.G, I.A.F and many other Para military forces because of their large young population in India. Recently these states are working for their improvement by developing infrastructures, IT-parks and giving a better invitation to the businessmen for investment. Also Madhya Pradesh enlisted at second position in U.N.O. GDP development ranking's with a record of 225%.

Population growth
The BIMARU states have some of the highest fertility rates in India. In 2010, the total fertility rate was 3.9 for Bihar, 3.5 for Uttar Pradesh, 3.2 for Madhya Pradesh, and 3.1 for Rajasthan, compared to 2.5 for India as a whole. This leads to high population growth in these states than rest of India.

Literacy rates
The literacy rates in these states according to the 2011 census are Bihar 63.8%, Rajasthan 67.1%, Jharkhand 67.6%, Madhya Pradesh 70.6% and Uttar Pradesh 71.7% against a national average of 74.04%. While they trail the national average in the current literacy rate, they are registering very healthy growth rates in literacy comfortably outpacing states like Andhra Pradesh (67.7%) and Chhattisgarh (71%), which have comparable literacy levels (the exception being Rajasthan).

A recent survey by National University of Educational Planning and Administration (UNEPA) has determined that only 21% of all primary school teachers in Bihar and 12.8% in UP are Matriculates or lower.

Renowned educationists have asked for a complete overhaul of the educational system, particularly at the primary level.

Health care
The life expectancy in BIMARU states is lower than other Indian states. In fact, it is lower than the average life expectancy of India as a whole, implying that these states bring down the overall average as a whole.

Economic growth
Corruption remains one of the key factors reflecting poverty levels throughout the world and these states generally fare worse in the corruption indexes usually published.

It is one of the enigmas that in spite of the large representation in the parliament, these states could not get adequate resources for their development.

Another factor determining the BIMARU states' economic situation is the lack of investment in irrigation and flood control. In spite of the highest incidence of floods in this region, the investment to manage this has been rather meager. Even though the socialist era in India was known for large infrastructure projects, the most modern irrigation system of Bihar is the British built Son Command Canal System which was opened for use in the 1890s. This is in sharp contrast to projects like Bhakra Nangal Dam in Punjab.

Yet another factor is the lack of perspective in the planning exercise. For example, even though large portions of the national highway schemes: the Golden Quadrilateral and the East West corridor pass through the so-called BIMARU states, its alignment would not serve the population of these states. Let alone the main alignment, there is no provision even for by-passes to serve towns such as Ranchi, Patna, Dhanbad, Gaya or Jamshedpur.

Since 2000, there has also been a change in the geographic composition of these states, with Bihar being bifurcated into Bihar and Jharkhand; Madhya Pradesh being bifurcated into Madhya Pradesh and Chhattisgarh; and Uttar Pradesh being bifurcated into Uttar Pradesh and Uttarakhand.

See also
 Indo-Gangetic Plain
 Standard of living in India
 List of Indian states and union territories by GDP
 Ministry of Rural Development (India)
 Rural Development Foundation, India
 Economy of India
 Indo-Gangetic Plain
 Green Revolution in India

References

External links
 Jeffrey D. Sachs, Nirupam Bajpai, and Ananthi Ramiah. "Understanding Regional Economic Growth in India". CID Working Paper No. 88, March 2002. Center for International Development at Harvard University, Cambridge, Massachusetts. 
 The Hindu
 The Children of Ganga
 Deurbanisation of Bihar
 Centrally planned Inequality

Economy of India by state or union territory